Kim Yo-Han (born 16 August 1985, Gwangju) is a South Korean professional volleyball player.

Career

Clubs
Kim was selected first overall by the LIG Greaters in the 2007 V-League Draft, and subsequently became the starting outside hitter for the team in his rookie season.

After having a mediocre rookie season, Kim broke out in the 2008–09 season when he ranked fourth in total points with 513. The following season, he racked up a team-leading 530 total points, ranked fourth in the league. 

In the 2010–11 season, he was  sidelined with ankle ligament injury. He came back from the injury prior to the 2010-11 postseason but struggled throughout the postseason, scoring only 20 points in three semi-playoff games. 

In the 2011–12 season, Kim converted his position to opposite spiker to fill a void at opposite spiker after an injury to Milan Pepic. As an opposite spiker, Kim had another breakout season, scoring a career-high 671 points. 

Prior to the 2012-13 V-League season, Kim helped the Greaters win their first KOVO Cup, scoring over 20 points every game during the tourney, and eventually earned MVP honors. The Greaters, however, finished the 2012-13 regular season in fifth place, failing to reach the postseason. 

Kim was named the Greaters' captain in 2012. However, his team and individual performance deteriorated during his captaincy reign. From 2012 to 2017 the Greaters missed the playoffs and Kim's offensive stats declined gradually, plagued by ankle and waist problems.

After the 2016–17 season, Kim was traded to OK Savings Bank Rush & Cash, and converted his position to middle blocker due to his chronic waist injuries.

National team
While attending Inha University in 2005, Kim got called up to the South Korean national under-21 team for the 2005 World Junior Championship, where South Korea finished in sixth place.

As a junior at Inha University in 2006 Kim first joined the South Korean senior national team to compete in the 2006 Asian Games, where South Korea won gold.

Individual awards

Club
 2012 KOVO Cup - Most Valuable Player

National Team
 2009 Asian Championship - Best Spiker, Best Server
 2011 Asian Championship - Best Server

Filmography

Variety shows

References

External links
 Kim Yo-han at the International Volleyball Federation (FIVB)

1985 births
Living people
Sportspeople from Gwangju
South Korean men's volleyball players
Asian Games medalists in volleyball
Volleyball players at the 2006 Asian Games
Volleyball players at the 2010 Asian Games
Asian Games gold medalists for South Korea
Asian Games bronze medalists for South Korea
Medalists at the 2006 Asian Games
Medalists at the 2010 Asian Games
21st-century South Korean people